The papyrus yellow warbler, papyrus flycatcher-warbler or thin-billed flycatcher-warbler (Calamonastides gracilirostris) is a species of tree warbler; formerly, these were placed in the paraphyletic "Old World warblers". It is monotypic in its genus.
It is found in Burundi, Democratic Republic of the Congo, Kenya, Rwanda, Tanzania, Uganda, and Zambia.
Its natural habitat is swamps.
It is threatened by habitat loss.

Description
Compared with the dull browns and greys typical of swamp-dwelling warblers, this warbler is brightly coloured. It shows an underbelly of rich yellow and olive-brown upper parts. Its song consists of melodious liquid warbling.

References

 BirdLife International 2006.  Chloropeta gracilirostris.   2006 IUCN Red List of Threatened Species.   Downloaded on 10 July 2007.
Fregin, S., M. Haase, U. Olsson, and P. Alström. 2009. Multi-locus phylogeny of the family Acrocephalidae (Aves: Passeriformes) - the traditional taxonomy overthrown. Molecular Phylogenetics and Evolution 52: 866–878.

External links

Gallery

papyrus yellow warbler
Birds of East Africa
papyrus yellow warbler
papyrus yellow warbler
Taxonomy articles created by Polbot